Trichostephanus is a genus of flowering plants belonging to the family Salicaceae.

Its native range is Cameroon and Gabon.

Species:
 Trichostephanus acuminatus Gilg 
 Trichostephanus gabonensis Breteler

References

Salicaceae
Salicaceae genera